Proprioseiopsis isocaudarum is a species of mite in the family Phytoseiidae.

References

isocaudarum
Articles created by Qbugbot
Animals described in 1993